Ivy Adara is an Australian singer and composer born in 1995. Adara has written for artists such as Selena Gomez and Hailee Steinfeld and started her career by competing in the eighth season of The X-Factor Australia.

Career and early life 
Adara wrote her first song at age seven and knew music was going to be in her life and often turned chores into musical productions. In 2016, Adara joined the eight season of The X-Factor Australia where she performed Sia's song "Alive" but did not make it past the early rounds of the show despite a standing ovation from Guy Sebastian.

After the X-Factor she relocated to Los Angeles where she has co-wrote songs for Dami Im, Natalie Conway, Jessica Mouboy, Selena Gomez, Jason DeRulo, Jennifer Lopez, Rita Ora, G-Eazy and Hailee Steinfeld. Adara experienced a number one song on Australian iTunes with the song she wrote for Jessica Mauboy, "Fallin" which was nominated for 5 ARIA & 3 APRA awards including Song Of the Year. 

In 2017, Adara released the songs "Famous" and "Everybody Hurts (Feat. The Him)". 

In 2018, Adara released her solo EP "Intraduction" that was created in collaboration with hitmakers Cirkut, Jon Hume and Lindsey Jackson. In the same year, the producer Gryffin released the song "Bye Bye" featuring Adara, who co-wrote the song. They toured together and performed it at Coachella.

In 2019, TikTok star Loren Gray released the song "Lie Like That" which was co-written by Adara.

In 2021, the singles "Pressure" and "Stranger" were released as part of her solo project. The song Stranger came about when Adara had been feeling depressed and her father flew to LA to see her from Sydney. She stated that she picked up her pen and guitar and the song just flowed out. In 2022, Adara has upcoming releases that will feature in the Jennifer Lopez movie, Marry Me.

Adara's discography has over 200 million streams on Spotify alone as of 2021. She describes her music as hopeful, dark, warm, empowering, vulnerable and authentic.

Personal life 
Inspiration for her music comes mostly from Adara's personal experiences and she looks up to Lorde, Khalid and Troye Sivan. 

Adara was supposed to marry on August 6, 2021, but the ceremony was canceled due to the COVID-19 pandemic lockdowns.

Adara resides in Los Angeles.

References 

1995 births
Living people
21st-century Australian women singers
Australian expatriates in the United States
Australian songwriters
Australian women in electronic music